Bechir Kchouk (1924-1983) was a Tunisian chess player.

Chess career
From the end of 1950s to the end of 1970s, Bechir Kchouk was one of the leading Tunisian chess players.

Bechir Kchouk played for Tunisia in the Chess Olympiads:
 In 1958, at third board in the 13th Chess Olympiad in Munich (+6, =4, -6),
 In 1960, at first reserve board in the 14th Chess Olympiad in Leipzig (+3, =9, -4),
 In 1962, at third board in the 15th Chess Olympiad in Varna (+3, =4, -6),
 In 1966, at third board in the 17th Chess Olympiad in Havana (+6, =6, -5),
 In 1968, at third board in the 18th Chess Olympiad in Lugano (+3, =4, -7),
 In 1970, at third board in the 19th Chess Olympiad in Siegen (+3, =3, -9),
 In 1972, at second board in the 20th Chess Olympiad in Skopje (+3, =6, -7),
 In 1978, at fourth board in the 23rd Chess Olympiad in Buenos Aires (+1, =1, -6).

Bechir Kchouk played for Tunisia in the European Team Chess Championship preliminaries:
 In 1973, at third board in the 5th European Team Chess Championship preliminaries (+1, =0, -1).

References

External links

1924 births
1983 deaths
Sportspeople from Tunis
Tunisian chess players
Chess Olympiad competitors
20th-century Tunisian people